Gerhard Sturmberger (1 May 1940 – 13 January 1990) was an Austrian footballer playing as a defender from 1959-1976. He played on the Austria national team for 5 years, from 1965 - 1973, he appeared in 43 international matches.

References

External links
 Rapid Archiv
 Sturm Archiv

1940 births
1990 deaths
Austrian footballers
Austria international footballers
Association football defenders
Austrian Football Bundesliga players
SK Rapid Wien players
LASK players